Braddock Road has the following meanings:
Braddock Road (Braddock expedition), the road in Maryland and Pennsylvania laid out by the Braddock expedition, including:
Maryland Route 49, a state highway in Allegany County, Maryland
Braddock Road (Northern Virginia), signed as State Route 620
Braddock Road (Alexandria, Virginia)
Braddock Road (Washington Metro), a subway station in Alexandria, Virginia

See also
 Braddock (disambiguation)